The Southern Tablelands Temperate Grassland, formally Natural Temperate Grassland of the Southern Tablelands, is a temperate grassland community situated in the Southern Tablelands and Monaro region of New South Wales, extending into the Australian Capital Territory and the Victorian border. Listed as Endangered under the Environment Protection and Biodiversity Conservation Act 1999, the grassland is dominated by reasonably tall, dense to open tussock grasses.

Geography
The community is commonly present in the Southern Tablelands of NSW and ACT, where it covers areas such as, Goulburn, Braidwood, Yass, Abercrombie River, Boorowa, Jindabyne, Bombala, south to the Victorian border at Delegate, on the eastern boundary of Kosciuszko National Park. The area features relatively low rainfall between 560 and 1200 metres in altitude, with low nutrient, highly textured soils on the valleys and low slopes (which grade with grassy woodland), and on the wider plains. 

20 000 ha of natural temperate grassland was present in the ACT prior to European settlement and in NSW around 450 000 ha of grassland occurred. In the ACT there are four reserved sites that comprise a total area of 206 ha of grassland and in NSW there are two proposed nature reserves totaling around 200 ha. The region lies on broad plains with poor drainage and features cold air inversions that encourages frosts which suppresses tree growth. The scattered community is bounded by the Snowy Mountains and Brindabella Range in the southwest, with he northwestern boundary passing from Burrinjuck Dam and to the Lachlan River and north to Wyangala Dam.

Ecology
The area predominantly features moderately tall (25-50 cm) to tall (50 cm-1 m), thick to open tussock grasses, such as Bothriochloa macra, Themeda australis, Austrodanthonia spp., Austrostipa and Poa spp with up to 70% of the species being forbs, which are namely daisies, lilies and native legumes. The grassland is generally treeless, though trees may be present in low densities (10%), either as sporadic individuals or in clusters, with the main tree species being Eucalyptus melliodora. Herbs, wildflowers and forbs species include: 

Diuris chryseopsis
Dillwynia glaucula
Diuris pedunculata
Dodonaea procumbens
Leucochrysum albicans
Prasophyllum petilum
Rutidosis leptorrhynchoides
Carex inversa
Schoenus apogon
Lomandra filiformis
Wurmbea dioica
Bulbine bulbosa
Diuris chryseopsis
Microtis unifolia
Cheilanthes austrotenuifolia
Asperula conferta  
Chrysocephalum apiculatum 
Convolvulus erubescens
Cymbonotus lawsonianus
Desmodium varians
Craspedia variabilis
Wahlenbergia communis
Ajuga australis
Eryngium ovinum
Geranium solanderi
Dichondra repens
Brachyloma daphnoides 
Lissanthe strigosa
Melichrus urceolatus
Cryptandra amara
Daviesia genistifolia
Hymenanthera dentata
Hibbertia obtusifolia 
Dodonaea procumbens 
Hakea microcarpa

Animals 

 Synemon plana
 Aprasia parapulchella	
 Delma impar	
 Suta flagellum		 	 
 Dodonaea procumbens		
 Prasophyllum petilum		
 Rutidosis leptorrhynchoides
 Microseris lanceolata
 Synemon plana
 Tympanocryptis pinguicolla
 Lampropholis delicata
 Neobatrachus sudelli
 Coturnix ypsilophora
 Gallinago hardwickii

References 

Grasslands of Australia
Remnant urban bushland
Vegetation of Australia
Temperate grasslands, savannas, and shrublands
Environment of New South Wales
Landforms of the Australian Capital Territory
Ecoregions of New South Wales
Endangered Ecological Community